P7, P.7, or P-7 may refer to:

Aircraft
 Boeing XP-7, a prototype United States biplane fighter of the 1920s
 HAT-P-7b, an extrasolar planet discovered in 2008
 Lockheed P-7, a proposed patrol aircraft ordered by the U.S. Navy
 Piaggio P.7, an Italian hydrofoil racing seaplane of 1929
 PZL P.7, a 1930 Polish fighter aircraft

Science
 p7 protein, a protein providing nucleocapsid of HIV
 Period 7 of the periodic table
 Seoul Semiconductor, high-energy quad-chip LED light (SSC P7)

Computer science
 Intel Itanium processor code-name
 Intel NetBurst microarchitecture, a seventh generation x86 microarchitecture
 X.400 protocol for access of a message store from a user agent

Other
 Cinturato P7 tire developed by Pirelli
 DR P7 Mix, a former radio station operated by the Danish Broadcasting Corporation
 Heckler & Koch P7, a semi-automatic pistol manufactured in Germany
 ProSieben, a German television channel
 Russian Sky Airlines IATA airline code
 South Scanian Regiment, Swedish Army armoured regiment with a designation P 7